"I, (Annoyed Grunt)-Bot", also known as "I, D'oh-Bot", is the ninth episode of the fifteenth season of the American animated television series The Simpsons. It originally aired on the Fox network in the United States on January 11, 2004. This episode represents a milestone in the history of the series as Snowball II is killed off, which, excluding the death of Homer's mother in Season 19's "Mona Leaves-a", is the closest thing to an actual Simpson family member actually being killed off as of Season 34.

The primary plot is based on Richard Matheson's short story "Steel".

Plot
Bart is taunted by school bullies Nelson, Jimbo, Dolph and Kearney because he does not have a 10-speed bike as they do. In order to get Homer to buy him one, Bart has his current bike run over by Dr. Hibbert's Mercedes-Benz G500. Homer buys the 10-speed for Bart, but refuses to pay the small assembly fee and builds it himself. Bart is happy since it looks great and works perfectly at first, but it falls apart when he moons the bullies. Homer, wanting Bart to be proud of him, tries to build a battle robot for the show Robot Rumble. He fails to construct one, and instead assumes the identity of one, which Bart names "Chief Knock-a Homer". Unaware of Homer's ruse, Bart enters the robot in the Rumble.

Meanwhile, Dr. Hibbert's car runs over and kills the Simpsons' cat Snowball II, shortly after crushing Bart's bike. A devastated Lisa recites a poem tearfully at the funeral, where Snowball II is buried next to Snowball I. Lisa adopts a ginger cat, which she names Snowball III, but he drowns in the fish tank. The next cat, Coltrane (Snowball IV), jumps out of a window after hearing Lisa play her saxophone. The owner of the cat sanctuary refuses to give Lisa any more cats, but the Crazy Cat Lady wanders past and throws a cat at Lisa that strongly resembles Snowball II. Although Lisa tries to shoo it off, worried that it will meet the same fate as the others, it survives a near miss on the street when Gil Gunderson it swerves to avoid hitting it while driving and crashes into a tree. Lisa decides to keep the cat, officially naming it Snowball V; however, the family will call it Snowball II in order to maintain the status quo. Principal Skinner comments disparagingly on the choice, but relents when Lisa points out that the same had previously been done for him.

Homer defeats numerous opponents and makes it to the finals, despite being injured from the battles with the other robots. In the final match against Professor Frink's undefeated super-robot, an ED-209 look-a-like, Bart finds Homer in the bot after the grueling first round. Caught, Homer apologizes to Bart, but Bart is impressed because of all the pain Homer went through to win his son's admiration. In the second round, ED-209 squeezes Homer out of the robot, but immediately stops as soon as it sees him. Frink explains that the robot follows Isaac Asimov's Three Laws of Robotics and has been programmed to serve humans rather than harm them. ED-209 sets out a chair for Homer and pours him a martini. Homer wins the match (although one of the commentators points out that the first rule from the tournament's rulebook disqualified any human combatants) and Bart is proud of him.

Cultural references
 The title of the episode includes the phrase "(Annoyed Grunt)" which is how Homer's catch-phrase "D'oh!" is written in episode scripts. Making the episode title read "I, D'oh-bot" - a play on Isaac Asimov's I, Robot as well as the sci-fi action movie of the same name released later the same year.
 Robot Rumble parodies the robot combat shows Robot Wars and BattleBots.
 Homer's robot, Chief Knock-a Homer, is a reference to the former Atlanta Braves mascot Chief Noc-A-Homa.
 The song playing while Bart and Milhouse are cycling is "Magic Carpet Ride" performed by Steppenwolf.
 During one of the Robot Rumble matches, one of the commentators states that one robot is "killing him softly with his saw," a reference to the Roberta Flack song.
 Dr. Hibbert has a Kool and the Gang air-freshener in his car.
 The song playing during the Robot Rumble montage is "Watching Scotty Grow" performed by Bobby Goldsboro (The same song played in the Season 3 episode "Saturdays of Thunder" as Homer was helping Bart build a soapbox racer). Homer also sings part of this song when delirious from blood loss and a concussion.
 One of the robots advertised for Robot Rumble is the T-800 endoskeleton from the Terminator film series.
 Professor Frink's robot is named 'Smashius Clay' a.k.a. 'Killhammad Aieee', based on the boxer Muhammad Ali and his birth name  Cassius Clay.
 Professor Frink's robot is designed after the ED-209 from the film RoboCop and its accompanying series.
 Lisa's fourth cat, Coltrane, is named after the influential jazz performer John Coltrane.
 The robot Circuit Ray Leonard is based on the boxer Sugar Ray Leonard.
 The song playing while Homer fights Professor Frink's robot is "...In A Bag" by Static-X.
 While Lisa is preparing food for Snowball III, she sings a song with the same melody as the Hokey Pokey song.

Reception

DVD Movie Guide's Colin Jacobson was critical of the episode, saying it "starts pretty well but droops before too long. The robot theme is too silly, and the cat sequences are too morbid. Some of the battle bots bits amuse, but they're not enough to overcome the episode's general flaws."

External links

"I, (Annoyed Grunt)-Bot" at The Simpsons.com

2004 American television episodes
The Simpsons (season 15) episodes
Television episodes about robots
Robot combat